Oenopota rosea is a species of sea snail, a marine gastropod mollusc in the family Mangeliidae.

According to J.Tucker, this species is a synonym of Oenopota harpularius, itself a synonym of Propebela harpularia (Couthouy, 1838)

Description

Distribution
This marine species is circumboreal and also occurs off Alaska, Simeonoff Island to San Juan Islands, Washington, USA.

References

 Lovén, Sven Ludvig. Index molluscorum: litora Scandinaviæ occidentalia habitantium. Faunæ prodromum. PA Norstedt, 1846.
 G. O. Sars Moll. Reg. Arct. Norv., pi. 23, fig. 10

External links
  Dall, William Healey. Summary of the marine shellbearing mollusks of the northwest coast of America: from San Diego, California, to the Polar Sea, mostly contained in the collection of the United States National Museum, with illustrations of hitherto unfigured species. No. 112. Govt. print. off., 1921   
 Femorale: Oenopota rosea
 

rosea
Gastropods described in 1846